Andrea Green is a British actress and presenter. She is known for her role as Sarah Finch in the BBC soap opera Doctors, for which she was awarded Best Newcomer at the 2005 British Soap Awards. Prior to this, Green was a continuity presenter on CITV.

Filmography

References

External links
 

British soap opera actresses
British television presenters
Living people
Year of birth missing (living people)